Miss Chinese International Pageant 1997 was held on January 26, 1997 in Hong Kong. The pageant was organized and broadcast by TVB in Hong Kong. Miss Chinese International 1996 Siew-Kee Cheng crowned Monica Lo of Toronto, Ontario, Canada as the winner.

Pageant information
The slogan and theme to this year's pageant is "The Oriental Legend 1997" 「東方神話1997」.  The Masters of Ceremonies were Eric Tsang and Carol Cheng.

Results

Special awards
Miss Friendship: Wendy Giam 嚴慧賢 (Kuala Lumpur)
Miss Oriental Charm: Hannah Toh 卓海倫 (Singapore)

Crossovers
Contestants who previously competed or will be competing at other international beauty pageants:

Miss World
 1996:  Macau  : Guiomar da Silva Pedruco

Miss Universe
 1997: : San San Lee

External links
 Johnny's Pageant Page - Miss Chinese International Pageant 1997

TVB
Miss Chinese International Pageants
1997 beauty pageants
1997 in Hong Kong
Beauty pageants in Hong Kong